The ArcLight Hollywood was a 15-screen multiplex located at 6360 Sunset Boulevard in Hollywood, California. All 15 screens featured stadium seating, and carried a THX certification for optimal sound and picture presentation. The building is located adjacent to the Cinerama Dome, which is a part of the ArcLight complex.

History
The theater opened on March 22, 2002. The ArcLight Hollywood was the first theatre in the ArcLight chain to open, and was considered to be the company's flagship. It was a subsidiary of The Decurion Corporation, which also owned Pacific Theatres.

The theater closed temporarily in March 2020, due to the COVID-19 pandemic. On April 12, 2021, Pacific Theatres announced that both the entire ArcLight and Pacific Theatres chains would permanently close, citing the lack of a viable path forward after the pandemic. The parent company, The Decurion Corporation, said in a statement to the Los Angeles Times that, “After shutting our doors more than a year ago, today we must share the difficult and sad news that Pacific will not be reopening its ArcLight Cinemas and Pacific Theatres locations,” Pacific Theatres said in a statement. “This was not the outcome anyone wanted, but despite a huge effort that exhausted all potential options, the company does not have a viable way forward.” In June 2022, it was announced that Decurion Corp. has plans to reopen the 14-screen multiplex and to include two bars and a restaurant at the location. In September of that year, it was reported that the cinema would not be reopening until at least the latter part of 2023.

Other locations
On June 19, 2021, Regal Cinemas acquired the lease of the ArcLight Cinemas at Sherman Oaks Galleria. Regal planned to remodel the cinema putting in $10M added IMAX, Regal RPX, ScreenX, & 4DX. The theater reopened in July 2021 as part of the Regal Cinemas chain. In January 2023, however, it was announced that the theater would close on February 15 of that year unless the lease was renegotiated. In November 2021, it was announced that Landmark Theaters had acquired the lease to The Glen Town Center's Arclight Cinemas in Glenview, Illinois. It reopened as part of the company's chain the following year. In December 2021, AMC Theatres announced that they had acquired the lease to the Arclight Chicago 14 in Lincoln Park, Chicago, which reopened as part of the AMC chain in 2022. In February 2022, AMC Theatres reached a deal to acquire the leases to Arclight UTC 14 at Westfield UTC mall in La Jolla, California and the Arclight Montgomery 16 at Westfield Montgomery in Bethesda, Maryland. The former reopened during that month and the latter resumed business in March of that year. In December 2022, it was announced that AMC Theaters acquired the lease to the former ArcLight Theater located at The Hub on Causeway in Boston and that it would reopen as part of the company's chain in the spring of 2023.

Amenities
ArcLight Hollywood provided numerous amenities to its customers. Each theater had reserved seating. The only promotional material shown before showtimes were trailers. 

At showtime, immediately before the trailers began, an usher would introduce the film to the audience and state the ArcLight's policies regarding quality assurance, i.e. two ushers would remain in the theater until a few minutes after the film had begun, to ensure that the picture and sound quality were acceptable. The usher would also ask the audience to turn their cellphones to the silent function, and to refrain from texting. Seating was prohibited after a film had begun, in correlation with ArcLight's slogan, “Your Movie Time Uninterrupted.”

As of September 2011, all ArcLight locations showed digital presentations of their features. Each location had two houses with Kinoton 35mm projectors for archival and special presentations.

The ArcLight routinely featured exhibits of local art or props and costumes from current films.

Seating
Tickets for all film showings featured assigned seating.  Upon purchasing a ticket, customers were allowed to select their preferred seat and see which seats had already been reserved.  The only restriction was the inability to select a seat if it created a single seat space between an already reserved seat.  This was to prevent orphan empty seats which could only be filled by a single individual.

Parking
Parking was located off Ivar to the west and DeLongpre to the south and off Sunset, just east of the Cinerama Dome in an adjacent garage. The parking garage was not originally owned by ArcLight, but was purchased by its parent company in 2016. The garage also served several restaurants, stores, and a gym located in the ArcLight complex, as well as the adjacent Amoeba Music, which had its own parking lot but offered validation at the Ivar structure as well.

Other locations
ArcLight Sherman Oaks opened November 16, 2007, in place of the Galleria Pacific Theater, after extensive remodeling. The grand opening took place on December 14.

On March 2, 2010, ArcLight announced the opening of a new location in Pasadena at Pacific Theaters at Paseo Colorado. The new location opened in the Summer of 2010.

In late 2010, Pacific Theaters refurbished an existing Pacific Theaters multiplex as an ArcLight in the South Bay Area of Los Angeles in the city of El Segundo. The new location was called "ArcLight Beach Cities".

In November 2012, ArcLight opened its first location outside of Los Angeles County. The "ArcLight La Jolla", located in San Diego, California at Westfield UTC, was part of the mall's $180 million renovation.

In October 2014, the first location outside California opened at Westfield Montgomery in Bethesda, Maryland.

In 2015, ArcLight opened two locations in the Midwest, both in the state of Illinois. The first screen in Glenview, Illinois, opened in May 2015, followed by the second location in Chicago in November 2015. The Glenview location was previously occupied by Regal and extensively remodeled to the chain's standards, while the Chicago location was the chain's first theatre constructed in the Midwest.

In addition to the ArcLight Chicago, the chain opened the first of two proposed locations in Santa Monica, California in November 2015 in the newly remodeled Santa Monica Place. In August 2017, the developer for the second ArcLight screen announced that they were abandoning the deal, citing doubts about its profitability due to being in close proximity to the Santa Monica Place ArcLight screen. If completed, it would have featured the first ArcLight IMAX screen.

In January 2016, the first northeast location was announced for ArcLight Boston in Boston, Massachusetts.

References

External links

 

2002 establishments in California
2021 disestablishments in California
Former cinemas in the United States
Theatres completed in 2002
Cinemas and movie theaters in Hollywood, Los Angeles
Companies based in Los Angeles
Landmarks in Los Angeles
Movie theatre chains in the United States
Companies that have filed for Chapter 7 bankruptcy